The women's eight event at the 2020 Summer Olympics took place from 24 to 30 July 2021 at the Sea Forest Waterway. Seven nations were represented with one boat each; 56 rowers and 7 coxswains competed.

Background
Women first competed in Olympic rowing at the 1976 Montreal Olympics and the eight was competed all Olympics since then, such that this was the twelfth appearance of the event.

Qualification

Each National Olympic Committee (NOC) is limited to a single boat in the event. There were seven qualifying places in the women's eight:

 5 from the 2019 World Championship (New Zealand, Australia, the United States, Canada, and Great Britain)
 2 from the final qualification regatta (China and Romania)

Schedule
The event was originally scheduled to start on 25 July 2021, but a poor weather forecast for 26 July resulted in a revised regatta programme, with the heats for the eight moving to the previous day. The competition was held over seven days.

All times are Japan Standard Time (UTC+9)

Rowers per team

Results

Heats

Heat 1

Heat 2

Repechage
Five nations qualify for the repechage; the top four qualify for the final.

Final

References

Women's eight
Women's events at the 2020 Summer Olympics